Unity is a city in Baker County, Oregon, United States, located in the Burnt River Valley. The population was 71 at the 2010 census.

History
The town was never platted. A post office was established in Unity in 1891. A sawmill existed for some time. The Unity Ranger Station, which was built by the Civilian Conservation Corps, is listed on the National Register of Historic Places. In 2017, Unity experienced a total solar eclipse

Geography

Climate 
This climatic region is typified by large seasonal temperature differences, with warm to hot (and often humid) summers and cold (sometimes severely cold) winters.  According to the Köppen Climate Classification system, Unity has a humid continental climate, abbreviated "Dfb" on climate maps.

Demographics

2010 census
As of the census of 2010, there were 71 people, 36 households, and 20 families living in the city. The racial makeup of the city was 83.1% White, 4.2% Native American, and 12.7% Asian. Hispanic or Latino of any race were 8.5% of the population.

There were 36 households, of which 22.2% had children under the age of 18 living with them, 38.9% were married couples living together, 5.6% had a female householder with no husband present, 11.1% had a male householder with no wife present, and 44.4% were non-families. 41.7% of all households were made up of individuals, and 16.6% had someone living alone who was 65 years of age or older. The average household size was 1.97 and the average family size was 2.65.

The median age in the city was 49.6 years. 18.3% of residents were under the age of 18; 0.0% were between the ages of 18 and 24; 25.2% were from 25 to 44; 32.4% were from 45 to 64; and 23.9% were 65 years of age or older. The gender makeup of the city was 56.3% male and 43.7% female.

2000 census
As of the census of 2000, there were 131 people, 57 households, and 36 families living in the city. The population density was 283.0 people per square mile (110.0/km). There were 75 housing units at an average density of 162.0 per square mile (63.0/km). The racial makeup of the city was 97.71% White, 1.53% Native American, and 0.76% from two or more races. Hispanic or Latino of any race were 2.29% of the population.

There were 57 households, out of which 35.1% had children under the age of 18 living with them, 47.4% were married couples living together, 7.0% had a female householder with no husband present, and 35.1% were non-families. 33.3% of all households were made up of individuals, and 8.8% had someone living alone who was 65 years of age or older. The average household size was 2.30 and the average family size was 2.89.

In the city, the population was spread out, with 29.0% under the age of 18, 10.7% from 18 to 24, 24.4% from 25 to 44, 26.7% from 45 to 64, and 9.2% who were 65 years of age or older. The median age was 37 years. For every 100 females, there were 104.7 males. For every 100 females age 18 and over, there were 97.9 males.

The median income for a household in the city was $27,679, and the median income for a family was $28,250. Males had a median income of $28,750 versus $14,375 for females. The per capita income for the city was $13,673. There were 5.3% of families and 15.8% of the population living below the poverty line, including 8.0% of under eighteens and 33.3% of those over 64.

References

External links
Entry for Unity in the Oregon Blue Book

Cities in Baker County, Oregon
Cities in Oregon
Populated places established in 1891
1891 establishments in Oregon